Ensdorf Abbey (Kloster Ensdorf) was a house of the Benedictine Order located at Ensdorf in Bavaria in Germany.

Dedicated to Saint James, the monastery was founded in 1121 by Pfalzgraf Otto of Wittelsbach.

It was dissolved in 1556 but restored in 1669, only to be dissolved again in 1802 in the secularisation of the period.

The premises were taken over in 1920 by the Salesians of Don Bosco, who still occupy them.

External links 

 Website of Kloster Ensdorf
 Klöster in Bayern

Benedictine monasteries in Germany
Salesian monasteries
Monasteries in Bavaria
1120s establishments in the Holy Roman Empire
1121 establishments in Europe
Religious organizations established in the 1120s
Christian monasteries established in the 12th century